Billel Benhammouda (28 August 1997 – 10 June 2022) was an Algerian professional footballer who played as an attacking midfielder.

Early life
Benhammouda was born in Hadjout, Tipasa Province. His father Ali is a sports teacher and football coach and his two brothers are also a football players.

Club career

USM Alger
In July 2016, Benhammouda joined the reserve team of USM Alger. On 28 October 2017, he made his debut for the team in the Ligue 1 against CR Belouizdad as a substitute in 4–0 victory. On 7 July 2018 Benhammouda was promoted to USM Alger's first team, and in this season he participated in 14 matches. On 12 November 2018, he made his first game as a starter against MC Oran. At the end of the 2018–19 season he achieved his first title in his history. At the start of the 2019–20 season, he was expected to be one of the main elements, especially after the departure of several stars and match by match he has become one of the main players. On 5 January, in the 2019–20 Algerian Cup Benhammouda scored his first goal against USM Khenchela and made two assists for Aymen Mahious and Oualid Ardji in 6–1 victory. On 14 March 2020, he scored twice, his first in Ligue 1 against MC Oran, to lead them to their first victory in two months 4–1. On 6 November 2020, Benhammouda renewed his contract until 2023. In the 2021–22 season, Benhammouda started knocking on the doors of the national team and developing his performance, and on 20 November, he scored a double against US Biskra, a few days later Benhammouda scored another double this time against RC Relizane.

International career
Benhammouda participated with the Algeria national team in many categories and was the former captain of the Algeria under-23 national team. On 26 March 2019, he scored his first goals at the 2019 Africa U-23 Cup of Nations qualification against Equatorial Guinea in 3–1 victory. Algeria failed to qualify for the finals after the elimination against Ghana.

In June 2021, Benhammouda was called up by Madjid Bougherra for the first time to the Algeria A' national team against Liberia to inaugurate the new stadium in Oran in 5–1 victory. On 22 August 2021, Bougherra called up 26 players including Benhammouda to training camp in Qatar in preparation for the 2021 FIFA Arab Cup. In the second match against Burundi Benhammouda scored his first goal.

Death

After the end of the Algeria A' match against DR Congo A', Madjid Bougherra decided to lay off the players for one day. Benhammouda called his friend to take him home. On the road between Douaouda and Bou Ismaïl, he had a fatal traffic accident. The next day after a DNA examination his death was announced Benhammouda died at the age of 24. While USM Alger moved to Setif to play the last round match the team returned after hearing this collision news, Ligue de Football Professionnel (LFP) granted the request to postpone the match to a later date.

Career statistics

Club

International
Scores and results list Algeria A' goal tally first, score column indicates score after each Benhammouda goal.

Honours
USM Alger
 Algerian Ligue Professionnelle 1: 2018–19

References

External links
 

1997 births
2022 deaths
Algerian footballers
People from Hadjout
Association football forwards
Algeria under-23 international footballers
Algeria A' international footballers
Algerian Ligue Professionnelle 1 players
Algerian Ligue 2 players
USM Alger players
USMM Hadjout players
21st-century Algerian people
Road incident deaths in Algeria